John Aspinall may refer to:

 John Aspinall (zoo owner) (1926–2000), English zoo owner and gambler
 John Aspinall (engineer) (1851–1937), English engineer
 John Aspinall (politician) (c. 1815–1865), English Conservative Party politician, Member of Parliament for Clitheroe 1853
 John Aspinall (footballer) (born 1959), English footballer
 John Aspinall (cricketer) (1877–1932), Irish cricketer